Boughezoul is a town and commune in Médéa Province, Algeria. According to the 1998 census it has a population of 14,094.

The town is slated for building, infrastructural, and population expansions as it is resized and reshaped into a new green city.

References

Communes of Médéa Province
Médéa Province